Andrew Pringle or Andy Pringle may refer to:

 Andrew Pringle, Lord Alemore (died 1776), Scottish judge, Solicitor General for Scotland 1755–59, Lord of Session 1759–92
 Andrew Pringle (British Army officer) (Andrew Robert Douglas Pringle, born 1946), retired British Army officer, president of KBR's International Government and Defence business
 Andy Pringle (born ), retired Canadian bond trader and Conservative political activist in Ontario
 Andrew Pringle Jr. (born 1927), US Air Force general
 Andrew Pringle (cricketer) (born 1978), South African cricketer

See also 
 Andrew Seth Pringle-Pattison (1856–1931), Scottish philosopher
 Pringle (surname)